Tiggers may refer to:

TIGgers, members of The Independent Group for Change UK political party
Tigger, a fictional tiger-like character originally introduced in A. A. Milne's book The House at Pooh Corner; who refers to itself in the third person plural, Tiggers

See also

 
 
 
 Tiger (disambiguation)